is a former Japanese football player. He played for Japan national team. His father Yutaka Katayama was the former president of Nissan USA.

Club career
Katayama was born in Meguro, Tokyo on May 28, 1940. After graduating from Keio University, he joined Mitsubishi Motors in 1963. In 1965, Mitsubishi Motors joined new league Japan Soccer League. He won the champions in 1969. He also won 1971 Emperor's Cup. He retired in 1972. He played 107 games and scored 3 goals in the league. He was selected Best Eleven for 5 years in a row (1966-1970).

National team career
On August 2, 1961, when Katayama was a Keio University student, he debuted for Japan national team against Malaya. He was selected Japan for 1964 Summer Olympics in Tokyo and 1968 Summer Olympics in Mexico City. He played in all matches at both Olympics and won Bronze Medal at 1968 Olympics. In 2018, this team was selected Japan Football Hall of Fame. He also played at 1966 Asian Games. At 1972 Summer Olympics qualification in 1971, Japan's failure to qualify for 1972 Summer Olympics. This qualification was his last game for Japan. He played 38 games for Japan until 1971.

In 2007, Katayama was selected Japan Football Hall of Fame.

Club statistics

National team statistics

Awards
 Japan Soccer League Best Eleven: (5) 1966, 1967, 1968, 1969, 1970

References

External links

 
 Japan National Football Team Database
Japan Football Hall of Fame at Japan Football Association
Japan Football Hall of Fame (Japan team at 1968 Olympics) at Japan Football Association

1940 births
Living people
Keio University alumni
Association football people from Tokyo
Japanese footballers
Japan international footballers
Japan Soccer League players
Urawa Red Diamonds players
Olympic footballers of Japan
Footballers at the 1968 Summer Olympics
Footballers at the 1964 Summer Olympics
Olympic bronze medalists for Japan
Olympic medalists in football
Asian Games medalists in football
Footballers at the 1966 Asian Games
Medalists at the 1968 Summer Olympics
Asian Games bronze medalists for Japan
Association football defenders
Medalists at the 1966 Asian Games